Donja Dubica is a village in the municipality of Odžak, Bosnia and Herzegovina. It is located close to the Croatian border.

Demographics 
According to the 2013 census, its population was 1,472.

History 
In the Second World War, at the beginning of December 1944, the Croatian Ustasha committed mass slaughter in this village and in several other nearby villages with a Serbian majority (Trnjak, Zorice). 752 people were killed, of which 332 were children.

References

Populated places in Odžak